Gugan District is in Azarshahr County, East Azerbaijan province, Iran. At the 2006 census, its population was 23,616 in 6,473 households. The following census in 2011 counted 24,954 people in 7,764 households. At the latest census in 2016, the district had 24,873 inhabitants living in 8,117 households.

References 

Azarshahr County

Districts of East Azerbaijan Province

Populated places in East Azerbaijan Province

Populated places in Azarshahr County